National Institute of Homeopathy (NIH) is an autonomous organisation under the Ministry of Ayurveda, Yoga & Naturopathy, Unani, Siddha and Homeopathy (AYUSH), Government of India. It conducts the BHMS, MD (Homeopathy) and PhD (Homeopathy) courses in Homeopathy. The institute has a 250-bed hospital, with 10 for surgery and 10 for maternity cases.

History
National Institute of Homeopathy was established on 10 December 1975 as an autonomous organisation under the Ministry of Health and Family Welfare. It was located at Amherst Street, Kolkata and later shifted to the present location. It started awarding Bachelor of Homeopathic Medicine and Surgery (B.H.M.S.) degrees in 1987.

See also
 Central Council of Homeopathy
List of hospitals in India

References

External links
NIH official website

Homeopathic organizations
Educational institutions established in 1975
Homeopathic education
Affiliates of West Bengal University of Health Sciences
Universities and colleges in Kolkata
Ministry of AYUSH
Homoeopathic Medical Colleges in West Bengal
1975 establishments in West Bengal
Homeopathic colleges